is a private university in the city of Chiyoda-ku, Tokyo, Japan. The predecessor of the school was founded in 1890, and it was chartered as a university in 1946.

It is the only institution specializing exclusively in the teaching of dentistry in all of Japan.

The College's course spans over six years in which students study ten months per year. Freshmen students' courses include: Chemistry and Physics, Anatomy and Histology (General and Dental) and Physiology. However, junior students focus on Pathology (General and Dental), Bacteriology , Metallurgy, Prosthetic Dentistry and other things. Seniors on the other hand study, Oral Surgery, Orthodontia, Operative Dentistry, Crown and bridge-work, Laboratory work and Infirmary practice.

References

External links
 Official website 

 

Educational institutions established in 1890
Private universities and colleges in Japan
Universities and colleges in Chiba Prefecture
Dental schools in Japan
Buildings and structures in Chiba (city)
1890 establishments in Japan